Xiao Yanhong is a Chinese paralympic archer. She won the bronze medal at the Women's individual recurve - W1/W2 event at the 2008 Summer Paralympics in Beijing.

References

Chinese female archers
Living people
Paralympic silver medalists for China
Paralympic archers of China
Archers at the 2008 Summer Paralympics
Medalists at the 2008 Summer Paralympics
Medalists at the 2012 Summer Paralympics
Archers at the 2012 Summer Paralympics
Paralympic bronze medalists for China
Year of birth missing (living people)
Paralympic medalists in archery
21st-century Chinese women